Super Battletank 2 is a 1994 tank simulation video game that was released exclusively for the Super Nintendo Entertainment System.

Summary
This video game is the sequel to Super Battletank, and the player controls a M1A2 Battletank. There are 16 missions, all located in the Middle East. Using radar, the player must scout out groups of enemy tanks and use the primary turret to take out infantrymen, Jeeps, SCUD missiles, and armored personnel carriers. The Phalanx machine gun is used to take down enemy air threats like helicopters. Smoke screens can make the player temporarily invisible to enemy radar; turning them into a major threat. Players can also summon threats from the sky in the form of supply drops and airstrikes.

Reception 

Electronic Gaming Monthly commented that it "comes at you with more of everything: more combat views, more weapons and a dynamite air strike/smart bomb weapon! Fans of the first must check this out."

See also
Battle Tank
 Battlezone
 Robot Tank

References

1994 video games
Absolute Entertainment games
Pack-In-Video games
Super Nintendo Entertainment System games
Super Nintendo Entertainment System-only games
Video games developed in the United States
Video games set in the Middle East
Video game sequels
Tank simulation video games
Single-player video games